Westerpark is a neighbourhood of Amsterdam, Netherlands. It is bordered by the Staatsliedenbuurt on the south and the Spaarndammerbuurt on the northeast and Sloterdijk area of Westpoort on the west. 
It is a non-residential area, containing the park by the same name, the Westergasfabriek (former gas factory turned into a cultural center), the Sint-Barbara cemetery, and railyards.

Westerpark is also a former borough of the city, which was merged with into the borough of Amsterdam-West.

References

Amsterdam-West
Neighbourhoods of Amsterdam